Psychographic segmentation has been used in marketing research as a form of market segmentation which divides consumers into sub-groups based on shared psychological characteristics, including subconscious or conscious beliefs, motivations, and priorities to explain and predict consumer behavior. Developed in the 1970s, it applies behavioral and social sciences to explore to understand consumers’ decision-making processes, consumer attitudes, values, personalities, lifestyles, and communication preferences. It complements demographic and socioeconomic segmentation, and enables marketers to target audiences with messaging to market brands, products or services. Some consider lifestyle segmentation to be interchangeable with psychographic segmentation, marketing experts argue that lifestyle relates specifically to overt behaviors while psychographics relate to consumers' cognitive style, which is based on their "patterns of thinking, feeling and perceiving".

History 

In 1964, Harvard alumnus and social scientist Daniel Yankelovich wrote that traditional demographic traits—sex, age and education level—lacked the insights marketers needed to inform their strategies. He suggested to use of non-demographic segmentation to help companies better predict consumer behavior, to improve product development, distribution, pricing and advertising. Around the same time, market researcher Emanuel Demby began using the term ‘psychographics,’ to reference variations in attitudes, values and behaviors within a specific demographic segment.

Within a decade, Arnold Mitchell and others at the Stanford Research Institute developed the Values Attitudes and Lifestyles (VALS) psychographic methodology. Despite critics—including Daniel Yankelovich— it was embraced by leading marketers, prompting Advertising Age to call VALS "one of the ten top market research breakthroughs of the 1980s."

Advantages and disadvantages

Advances in computing power and the era of big data has fueled the use of all types of segmentation. By applying analytics to break down the marketplace of consumers into smaller groups, marketers and advertisers can profile and target key audiences more effectively. Each type of segmentation offers pros and cons.

 Attitudinal and psychographic segments may be projected across a population through predictive modeling based on many variables, though the accuracy may be greatly reduced.

Ultimately, the argument for any type of segmentation is to identify high-yield target markets that are likely to meet growth potential, profitability, or other specific goals.

Methods of model development

The traditional way to develop a psychographic segmentation model has been through a market research study surveying a statistically representative sample of a target audience. That target audience could be representative of the general population, a specific demographic or socioeconomic group, a population of consumers who utilize a certain product or service category or any group of people relevant to one’s research or business objectives.

The first step is the development of a robust questionnaire consisting of a series of attitudinal statements, often using a Likert scale (e.g., Strongly Agree = 1, Agree = 2, Neither Agree Nor Disagree = 3, Disagree = 4, Strongly Disagree = 5), to assess consumer beliefs about a given subject. Consideration should be given to dimensions that will differentiate consumers in the market, such as attitudes and beliefs about a certain topic or behaviors in a specific situation.

A factor analysis using statistical clustering procedures is conducted to examine response patterns to the survey questions. Natural clusters or segments emerge from groups of respondents who answer the survey questions in a similar manner. A useful illustration is a scatter plot with all of the respondents' answers that shows clusters of respondents who answered the survey questions similarly. Taking all the survey questions into account, consistent groups — or psychographic segments — are identified.

Statistical analysis of the respondents' answers can also identify an algorithm that uses a subset of the survey questions to classify consumers according to the psychographic segments. This could involve five, ten, fifteen or other limited set of questions that effectively categorize consumers by segment.

In addition to using surveys to gather psychographic data, experts suggest that social media monitoring and analytics can also help marketers identify trends in consumer interests, attitudes, sentiments, and psychographic clusters.

After using quantitative marketing research to identify psychographic segments, many marketers and researchers will follow up with qualitative research (e.g., focus groups and one-on-one interviews) with members of each psychographic segment. This allows for additional insights and translation of the quantitative data from the perspective of each segment. This is a useful step for helping to prevent bias in the researcher’s interpretation of the data, as researchers may view data through the lens of their own attitudes and motivations.

The optimal psychographic segmentation model should meet several criteria:

 It provides the most differentiation when comparing segments.
 It produces segments that are internally consistent.
 It provides actionable insights.
 It creates solutions that are stable and reproducible.
 It balances predictability with practicality.

A psychographic segmentation model should be able to accurately predict the segment to which a consumer belongs with an acceptable level of confidence. Often there are trade-offs involved. For instance, a model may attain a higher level of predictability with a greater number of segments, but too many segments become unwieldy and infeasible to juggle when operationalizing the model. This also pertains to the number of questions used in the algorithm to classify consumers by segment. More questions may be more predictive, but there are diminishing returns past a certain number of questions, and too many questions decrease completion rates among consumers.

Examples of psychographic segmentation use 

Consumers recognize that modern marketers and advertisers collect a wealth of data about prospects and customers. As a result, consumers hold brands to a higher standard. Individual consumers expect greater relevance and personalized brand experiences in exchange for the information they share. These expectations, in turn, have increased the need for psychographic segmentation.

Retail industry 

Marketers of educational/entertainment technology for the family (e.g., e-readers and video game systems), for example, can identify key audiences based on family income, ages of children in the household, or other demographic indicators. However, these factors do not identify the "why" behind purchases. Using psychographic segmentation, marketers can drill down to types of purchasers:

 'Enablers' who focus on the entertainment value of technology tend to let their children guide tech decisions.
 'Limiters' who regulate screen time tend to look for technology that offers educational value and family participation options.

Understanding these psychographic variations among likely consumers allows marketers to fine-tune keyword targeting to appeal to these distinct sub-groups.

Similarly, a retail drugstore chain uses a combination of segmentation to identify a super-user who is motivated by a sense of responsibility for family. Marketing strategies are therefore focused on a customer persona of a woman in her early 50s who manages medications for her children, herself and her spouse, and her aging parents.

Travel industry 

Business travelers have different needs and expectations than vacationers. However, marketing to such broad categories alone fails to capture motivations and personal preferences. Within the broad segment of Leisure Travelers, for example, travel brands can use psychographic segmentation to drill down to identify individuals as 'novelty-seeking' versus 'familiarity-seeking' consumers, and then customize campaigns based on the most relevant travel style.

Knowing that a consumer is 'familiarity-seeking', for example, could lead a travel brand to market guided tour travel packages to that consumer; a 'novelty-seeking' consumer could be targeted with a build-your-own tour package.

Healthcare industry 

The healthcare industry faces an ongoing mandate to engage patients more effectively to address chronic disease and engage in healthier behaviors. However, experts note that segmentation based on demographic or socioeconomic factors falls short on motivating engagement. Similarly, one-size-fits-all programs based on a shared diagnosis do not lead to high adoption rates of recommended behaviors.

Psychographic segmentation applied to healthcare consumers can help healthcare organizations, health insurance providers, healthcare-related retailers and others classify individual consumers according to whether they:

are proactively engaged in health and wellness or reactive and disengaged,
need directive guidance by healthcare professionals or want options and choices in their care,
believe in holistic and alternative medicine or dismiss it, relying only on traditional medicine,
prioritize others' health and wellness over their own,
display various other motivations, priorities and preferences.

Segmenting healthcare consumers by these factors allows one to customize messaging (whether verbal, print or digital) to appeal to individual motivations to improve overall engagement, drive behavior changes, boost adherence to care plans or increase adoption of medical devices and apps.

The use of psychographic segmentation and insights have been demonstrated in a clinical setting to improve outcomes, from helping patients with diabetes achieve personal health goals to reducing hospital readmissions following surgery.

References 

Market segmentation
Quantitative marketing research